Cacia monstrabilis is a species of beetle in the family Cerambycidae. It was described by Heller in 1915. It is known from Sulawesi.

References

Cacia (beetle)
Beetles described in 1915